Răzvan Andronic (born 7 January 2000) is a Romanian professional footballer who plays as a midfielder.

Club career

Botoșani
On 7 September 2018, Andronic joined Liga I side Botoșani. He made his senior debut in Liga I for Botoșani in a game against FCSB, game which Botoșani managed to win with 2–0. He also scored in his first official game against FCSB.He scored the first goal in the 18th minute from a pass from Aškovski.

CFR Cluj
After some good performances at Botoșani, CFR Cluj transferred Andronic on 10 February 2020.

References

External links
 
 

2000 births
Living people
Sportspeople from Cluj-Napoca
Romanian footballers
Association football midfielders
Liga I players
FC Botoșani players
CFR Cluj players
LPS HD Clinceni players
FC Brașov (2021) players
Liga II players